Malladeva was the son of the Karnat dynasty King, Nanyadeva and a prince of Mithila. According to some scholars, Malladeva has been referred to as the "forgotten King of Mithila" as most records and traditions note that his brother Gangadeva succeeded his father as ruler of the dynasty. Nevertheless, Malladeva seems to have founded his own stronghold in the village of Bheet-Bhagwanpur in Darbhanga in modern-day Bihar, India. In the village, an inscription was found which read "Om Shree Malladevasya" and many Karnat-era sculptures have been found in the area.

Malladeva has also been mentioned in the work of the poet, Vidyapati who described him as a "valiant warrior" who served in the army of King Jayachandra of Kannauj but left as his quarrelsome nature led to major disagreements and he was forced to return to Mithila. Local tradition asserts that he was not on good terms with his brother Gangadeva. Folk tradition also asserts that the villages of Maldiha in Purnea district and Malhad in Supaul district were founded by Malladeva.
The village of Bheet-Bhagwanpur is today home to a prominent family of Gandhavariya Rajputs who are considered by some to be descended from Malladeva.

References

12th-century Asian people
History of Bihar
History of Nepal
12th-century Nepalese people